General elections are expected to be held in India by May 2024 to elect the members of the 18th Lok Sabha.

Background
The tenure of Lok Sabha is scheduled to end on 16 June 2024. The previous general elections were held in April–May 2019. After the election, National Democratic Alliance, led by Bharatiya Janata Party, formed the union government, with Narendra Modi continuing as Prime Minister.

Electoral system
All 543 elected MPs are elected from single-member constituencies using first-past-the-post voting. The 104th amendment to the constitution effectively abolished the two seats that were reserved for the Anglo-Indian community.

Eligible voters must be Indian citizens, 18 years or older, an ordinary resident of the polling area of the constituency and registered to vote (name included in the electoral rolls), possess a valid voter identification card issued by the Election Commission of India or equivalent. Some people convicted of electoral or other offences are barred from voting.

Article 83 of the Constitution of India requires elections to the Lok Sabha be held once every five years.

Parties and alliances

Most of the contesting parties are small with regional appeal. The main parties are the Bharatiya Janata Party and the Indian National Congress.

National Democratic Alliance

The National Democratic Alliance (NDA) is centre-right to right-wing political alliance led by the Bharatiya Janata Party (BJP).

United Progressive Alliance

The United Progressive Alliance (UPA) is centre to centre-left political alliance led by the Indian National Congress (INC).

Congress will contest the election with the state-level alliances like Mahajot (Assam), Mahagathbandhan (Bihar), Mahagathbandhan (Jharkhand), United Democratic Front (Kerala), Maha Vikas Aghadi (Maharashtra), Secular Progressive Alliance (Tamil Nadu) and Sanjukta Morcha (West Bengal).

Out of the alliances mentioned above, INC will lead Mahajot (Assam) and United Democratic Front (Kerala).

Left parties

At the national level, five political parties including Communist Party of India (Marxist), Communist Party of India, Revolutionary Socialist Party, Communist Party of India (Marxist-Leninist) Liberation and All India Forward Bloc have given joint calls for action and struggles on various issues and experessed their positions of fighting together.

Communist Party of India (Marxist)
Communist Party of India (Marxist) will form state-specific alliances with left, democratic and secular parties to isolate and defeat the BJP. CPIM General Secretary Sitaram Yechury said that his party will ally with like-minded secular and democratic parties in various states like Rashtriya Janata Dal in Bihar and Samajwadi Party in Uttar Pradesh and national level political front will take shape only after the general election. CPIM Polit Bureau member and Chief Minister of Kerala Pinarayi Vijayan confirmed about CPIM's plan of forming state-level alliances and hinted an alliance with Bharat Rashtra Samithi in Telangana.

CPI(M) will contest election being a member of Mahajot (Assam), Mahagathbandhan (Bihar), Left Democratic Front (Kerala), Secular Progressive Alliance (Tamil Nadu), Secular Democratic Forces (Tripura), Samajwadi Gathbandhan (Uttar Pradesh) and Sanjukta Morcha (West Bengal).

It will lead Left Democratic Front (Kerala), Secular Democratic Forces (Tripura) and Sanjukta Morcha (West Bengal) among the aforesaid alliances.

Samajwadi Party
Samajwadi Party will lead an alliance in its stronghold Uttar Pradesh. Unlike other Lok Sabha elections, SP along with its allies may not support INC candidates in Amethi and Raebareli as the alliance is planning to field candidates in those constituencies.

Others
On 15 January 2023, Bahujan Samaj Party leader Mayawati announced that her party will contest the election on its own strength. 

Following a defeat in Sagardighi Assembly constituency by-election to the Left-Congress alliance in West Bengal on 2 March 2023, All India Trinamool Congress ruled out any alliance for the Lok Sabha election and AITC supremo and Chief Minister of West Bengal Mamata Banerjee said that her party will get the support of the people to fight BJP, INC and CPI(M).

Candidates

Campaigns

Bharatiya Janata Party
The national executive meeting of BJP held on 16 and 17 January 2023 saw the party reaffirm its faith in Prime Minister Narendra Modi and extend the tenure of BJP national president J. P. Nadda.

Charting out the BJP’s strategy for the upcoming polls, PM Modi in his speech to party workers said they should reach out to every section of society, including the marginalised and minority communities, “without electoral considerations”.

Indian National Congress
Senior Congress leader and former President of the Indian National Congress Rahul Gandhi was leading the movement named Bharat Jodo Yatra, by encouraging the party cadre and the public to walk from Kanyakumari at the southern tip of India in Tamilnadu to the union territory of Jammu and Kashmir, a journey of 3,570 kilometres (2,220 miles) over 150 days, which started from 7 September 2022 and ended on 30 January 2023 - a journey which took 146 days.

Congress announced the launch of Hath se Hath Jodo Yatra from 26 January 2023. Congress MP Jairam Ramesh said "The goal is to distribute the charge sheet against the BJP along with Rahul Gandhi’s letter from door to door".

Communist Party of India (Marxist)
Bihar : The CPI(M) Bihar state committee organised a massive state-wide campaign at Gandhi Maidan in Patna as part of nationwide campaign during 14 September to 22 September 2022 against the incumbent central government. CPIM took part in an “oust-Modi campaign” starting from Purnia on 25 February 2023 as a part of Mahagathbandhan in Bihar.

Kerala : The Kerala unit of CPI(M) started 21 day-long campaign from 1 January 2023. On 13 January 2023, CPIM Kerala unit announced state-wide march led by Polit Bureau member and state secretary M. V. Govindan against the central government. The Kerala CPIM has also announced a series of agitations against the NDA government at the centre starting from 20 January 2023. CPIM has planned to launch a state-wide campaign in March to highlight the Centre’s neglect of Kerala and its trespasses on federalism and secularism. On 20 February 2023, Pinarayi Vijayan inaugurated statewide Janakeeya Prathirodha Jatha (People’s Resistance Yatra) led by M. V. Govindan to expose the attacks on federalism and threats posed by the RSS-backed BJP government to the constitutional values of the nation. The rally, that covered 140 constituencies, concluded with a public meeting on 18 March 2023 in Thiruvananthapuram which was inaugurated by Sitaram Yechury.
Telangana : CPI(M) Telangana State committee will organise state-wide march named Jana Chaitanya Yatra starting from 17 March 2023 in order to protest against the pro-corporate and anti-people policies of the BJP led union government. On that day, CPI(M) General Secretary Sitaram Yechury at Warangal, Polit Bureau member B.V. Raghavulu at Adilabad and another Polit Bureau member A. Vijayaraghavan at Nizamabad will flag off the rallies.

See also
2024 elections in India

References

 
General
India
2024